Minerva is a village primarily in Stark and Carroll counties in the U.S. state of Ohio, with a small district in Columbiana County. The population was 3,684 at the 2020 census. Most of Minerva is part of the Canton–Massillon metropolitan area.

History
The village of Minerva began when a surveyor named John Whitacre purchased 125 acres of land from Isaac Craig in 1818 for the construction of a log mill. The town, named for his niece, Minerva Ann Taylor born April 19, 1833, grew up around the mill. Minerva's first schoolhouse was built in 1846. In its early years the Sandy and Beaver Canal helped drive Minerva's economy, to be replaced in importance by the Pennsylvania Railroad in the 1840s. Minerva manufacturers Willard and Isaac Pennock patented the United States' first steel railroad car in the nineteenth century.

In 1915, the town's weekly newspaper, The Minerva News, charged one dollar for an annual subscription.

Geography
Minerva is located along Sandy Creek.

Demographics

2010 census
As of the census of 2010, there were 3,720 people, 1,580 households, and 1,009 families living in the village. The racial makeup of the village was 97.7% White, 0.3% African American, 0.1% Native American, 0.3% Asian, 0.3% from other races, and 1.3% from two or more races. Hispanic or Latino of any race were 0.7% of the population.

There were 1,580 households, of which 29.9% had children under the age of 18 living with them, 45.4% were married couples living together, 13.6% had a female householder with no husband present, 4.9% had a male householder with no wife present, and 36.1% were non-families. 32.3% of all households were made up of individuals, and 16.6% had someone living alone who was 65 years of age or older. The average household size was 2.34 and the average family size was 2.93.

The median age in the village was 41.2 years. 23.6% of residents were under the age of 18; 7.9% were between the ages of 18 and 24; 22.8% were from 25 to 44; 25.9% were from 45 to 64; and 19.9% were 65 years of age or older. The gender makeup of the village was 47.4% male and 52.6% female.

2000 census
As of the census of 2000, there were 3,934 people, 1,603 households, and 1,082 families living in the village. The population density was 1,840.3 people per square mile (709.8/km). There were 1,718 housing units at an average density of 803.7 per square mile (310.0/km). The racial makeup of the village was 99.03% White, 0.05% African American, 0.08% Native American, 0.13% Asian, 0.05% from other races, and 0.66% from two or more races. Hispanic or Latino of any race were 0.48% of the population.

There were 1,603.5 households, out of which 30.31% had children under the age of 18 living with them, 51.1% were married couples living together, 12.9% had a female householder with no husband present, and 32.56% were non-families. 28.41% of all households were made up of individuals, and 13.1% had someone living alone who was 65 years of age or older. The average household size was 2.38 and the average family size was 2.91.

In the village, the population was spread out, with 23.6% under the age of 18, 8.8% from 18 to 24, 25.7% from 25 to 44, 23.5% from 45 to 64, and 18.5% who were 65 years of age or older. The median age was 40 years. For every 100 females there were 89.4 males. For every 100 females age 18 and over, there were 86.2 males.

The median income for a household in the village was $33,468, and the median income for a family was $39,669. Males had a median income of $30,477 versus $21,156 for females. The per capita income for the village was $116,853. About 6.3% of families and 9.8% of the population were below the poverty line, including 15.2% of those under age 18 and 7.3% of those age 65 or over.

Government

Minerva operates under a chartered council–manager government, where there are four council members elected as a legislature for 4-year terms in addition to a mayor, who serves as an executive. The council employs a village manager for administration. The current mayor is Tim Tarbet, and the current village administrator is Philip Turske.

Education
Children in Minerva are served by the Minerva Local School District. Schools currently serving Minerva include:
Minerva Elementary School – grades K-5
Minerva Middle School – grades 6-8
Minerva High School – grades 9-12

Notable people
 Carol Costello, television commentator, former host of CNN Newsroom
 John Cowan, soul music and progressive bluegrass musician; bassist for The Doobie Brothers
 Phil Davison, former candidate for Stark County Treasurer who earned internet fame for the aggressive and passionate manner of speaking he employed
 Oscar Grimes, baseball player, son of  Ray Grimes and nephew of Roy Grimes, twin brothers who were also major leaguers.
 Ralph Hodgson, poet
 Bill Powell, owner and designer of Clearview Golf Club, the first professional golf course owned and designed by an African-American and the first integrated golf course in America
 A. J. Trauth, actor and musician known for playing Alan Twitty on Even Stevens
 Theodore Newton Vail, telephone industrialist
 Charles Erwin Wilson, former U.S. Secretary of Defense and CEO for General Motors

References

External links
 

Villages in Carroll County, Ohio
Villages in Columbiana County, Ohio
Villages in Stark County, Ohio
Villages in Ohio
1818 establishments in Ohio
Populated places established in 1818